Palestra Ginnastica Libertas, also known as P.G. Libertas, was an Italian association football club from Florence founded in 1912. The club is short-lived, lasting little more than a decade before merging with fellow Florence club C.S. Firenze in 1926 to form A.C. Fiorentina, which would be one of Serie A's most dominant forces to this day.

References

ACF Fiorentina
Defunct football clubs in Italy
Football clubs in Tuscany
1912 establishments in Italy
1926 disestablishments in Italy